Octavio Robert Maginnis "Tavi" Castro (born February 3, 1990) is a Mexican-born Canadian bodybuilder, entrepreneur, DJ and former soccer player who lives in the Netherlands. Castro has won several Musclemania international bodybuilding titles to date.

Early life and education 
Octavio Maginnis Castro better known as Tavi Castro was born on February 3, 1990, in Guadalajara, Mexico. At the age of 4 Castro and his family moved to Canada and settled in Edmonton, Alberta. Castro played soccer for the majority of his youth and also played as a midfielder on the Canadian Youth National soccer team. At the age of 17, he moved to Europe to pursue a professional soccer career. In the Netherlands Castro played for the youth team of FC Dordrecht. At age 18, Castro left soccer in order to attend University and focus on his study. Castro has a bachelor's degree in Aerospace engineering from the TU Delft (Technische Universiteit Delft) and is completing his master's degree in Aerospace Engineering.

Career 
From his time as a soccer player Castro regularly went to the gym. After leaving soccer he continued to train at the gym to maintain his conditioning. After years of fitness training Castro moved to bodybuilding. He started doing bodybuilding competitions as a way of earning some extra cash. In 2012, Castro won 1st Place in the Musclemania Britain Junior bodybuilding Championship and 1st Place in the Musclemania Europe Junior bodybuilding Championship, as well as 1st Place in the Musclemania World Model Overall Championship USA.

During his Aerospace engineering study in 2012 Castro founded the largely popular online coaching and clothing brand Body Engineers

In September 2016, Castro also launched his professional career as DJ and music producer after he got signed with Netherlands-based Electronic Dance Music label Spinnin’ Records.

Tavi Castro - “Survive” signed to the revered Spinnin’ Records in 2016, the track went on to make the Top 30 in Spotify’s Global Viral Top 50, along with gaining major support from Martin Garrix, Tiësto, and Dimitri Vegas

In 2017 Tavi Castro - Moonlight ft ( Jay Fonseca ) broke the iTunes top 40 charts in the Netherlands and took top spot for 2 weeks

In a quick rise to popularity Tavi Castro debut at the Tomorrowland Music Festival in Boom Belgium in 2017 closing his set with his own production Tavi Castro - Unity.

Awards 
Castro has won the following bodybuilding titles
 2012 Musclemania Junior Champion Britain 1st Place and 2nd  Place in the Category Fitness Modeling
 2012 Musclemania Junior Champion Europe 1st Place
 2012 Musclemania World Model Overall Champion USA 1st Place
2020 NPC Regional qualifier Warsaw Poland Men’s Classic physique Champion

Personal life 
On the morning of January 25, 2016, Castro was involved in a car accident on the A2 highway. His management confirmed that Castro was driving on the A2 highway in his Maserati GranTurismo when his car got offtrack and collided with two other cars then coming to a standstill at the crash barrier. Luckily Castro walked away from it with only a concussion and a few minor injuries.

On August 24, 2017, Tavi Castro and his girlfriend, Bulgarian fitness model and entrepreneur Yanita Yancheva became the parents of their baby daughter Avia Castro.

Popularity 
Castro has a large following on social media with close to 8 million followers on Facebook and 2.9 million followers on Instagram. Castro made headlines when he discovered and mentored Nochtli Peralta Alvarez, a former police officer who became a fitness model. In 2017 Alvarez was named most beautiful woman in the Netherlands by FHM500 Magazine.

References 

1990 births
Living people
Sportspeople from Guadalajara, Jalisco
Mexican emigrants to Canada
Canadian bodybuilders
Canadian emigrants to the Netherlands